Wi Bok-Sun (born 8 July 1974) is a former international table tennis player from North Korea.

Table tennis career
She won a silver medal for North Korea at the 1993 World Table Tennis Championships in the Corbillon Cup (women's team event) with Li Bun-Hui, An Hui-Suk and Yu Sun-bok.

She also competed at the 1992 Summer Olympics, and reached the women's doubles quarter finals during the 1993 World Championships.

See also
 List of World Table Tennis Championships medalists

References

1974 births
Living people
North Korean female table tennis players
Asian Games medalists in table tennis
Table tennis players at the 1998 Asian Games
Medalists at the 1998 Asian Games
Asian Games silver medalists for North Korea
World Table Tennis Championships medalists
Olympic table tennis players of North Korea
Table tennis players at the 1992 Summer Olympics
20th-century North Korean women